BR24 is a cross-platform news brand of German public broadcaster Bayerischer Rundfunk (BR) which is at the same time a news website, a 24/7 news radio station (until 30 June, 2021: B5 aktuell) and a television news programme (until June 30, 2021: Rundschau).

On May 3, 2021, Bayerischer Rundfunk announced that B5 aktuell will be renamed to BR24 on July 1, 2021. Existing formats on television, such as the “Rundschau”, were preceded by a “BR24” in the name. The BR is thus creating a uniform brand for news. When it began broadcasting on May 6, 1991, B5 aktuell was the first information program in German-language radio.

Since the start of broadcasting, editors and technicians have been working in three shifts every day, with broadcasting beginning shortly before 6 a.m. each day. From midnight to 6 a.m., BR24 broadcasts the ARD Info night produced by NDR Info.  In March 2019, the station stepped up regional reporting from Bavaria and changed its programming scheme accordingly under the motto "From Bavaria for Bavaria."

References

Radio stations in Germany
Radio stations established in 1991
1991 establishments in Germany
Mass media in Munich
Bayerischer Rundfunk